
Loretto may refer to:

Places

Austria 
Loretto, Austria, a town in the district of Eisenstadt-Umgebung in Burgenland in Austria

Canada 
Loretto, Ontario

India 
Loretto, a village in Bantwal  taluk, Karnataka state, India

United States 
(by state)

Loretto, Kentucky
Loretto, Michigan
Loretto, Minnesota
Loretto, Nebraska
Loretto, Pennsylvania
Loretto, Tennessee
Loretto, Virginia
Loretto (Wytheville, Virginia)

Buildings and establishments 
Villa Loretto, Peekskill, New York
Federal Correctional Institution, Loretto, Pennsylvania
Our Lady of Loretto Roman Catholic Church and Cemetery, Honey Creek, Wisconsin

Education
Loretto Abbey Catholic Secondary School, North York, Toronto, Ontario
Loretto Academy (El Paso, Texas)
Loretto Academy (Kansas City, Missouri)
Loretto Academy (St. Louis, Missouri), listed on the NRHP in Missouri
Loretto College, part of the University of St. Michael's College, Toronto, Ontario
Loretto College School, Earlscourt, Toronto, Ontario
Loretto High School, Sacramento, California
Loretto School, Scotland
Loretto School of Childhood, Port Harcourt, Rivers State, Nigeria
Teikyo Loretto Heights University, Denver, Colorado

Other uses
Sisters of Loretto, American Catholic religious institute
Loretto Chapel, Santa Fe, New Mexico

See also
Loreto (disambiguation)
Sisters of Loreto, formally called the Institute of the Blessed Virgin Mary